The Mid Cork Junior A Hurling Championship (known for sponsorship reasons as the MKJ Oils Junior A Hurling Championship) is an annual hurling competition organised by the Muskerry Board of the Gaelic Athletic Association since 1926 for junior hurling teams in the Muskerry region in County Cork, Ireland.

The series of games begin in May, with the championship culminating with the final in September. The championship includes a knock-out stage and a "back door" for teams defeated in the first round.

The Mid Cork Junior Championship is an integral part of the wider Cork Junior Hurling Championship. The winners and runners-up of the Mid Cork championship join their counterparts from the other six divisions to contest the county championship.

Nine clubs currently participate in the Mid Cork Championship. The title has been won at least once by ten different teams. The all-time record-holders are Cloughduv, who have won a total of 22 titles.

Ballinora are the title-holders after defeating Grenagh by 0-16 to 0-11 in the 2022 final.

Teams

2023 Teams

Qualification for subsequent competitions

The Mid Cork Championship winners and runners-up qualify for the subsequent Cork Junior Hurling Championship. Prior to 2017 only the winners were permitted to progress to the county championship.

Roll of honour

List of finals

Records and statistics

Teams

By decade

The most successful team of each decade, judged by the number of Mid Cork Junior A Hurling Championship titles, is as follows:

 1920s: 2 each for Bride Valley (1925–26) and Ballinora (1928–29)
 1930s: 3 each for Blarney (1931-34-36) and Cloughduv (1933-38-39)
 1940s: 4 for Inniscarra (1941-42-45-47)
 1950s: 6 for Cloughduv (1950-51-53-56-57-59)
 1960s: 3 for Éire Óg (1960-61-62)
 1970s: 3 each for Éire Óg (1971-72-77) and Aghabullogue (1973-74-76)
 1980s: 6 for Aghabullogue (1981-83-84-86-88-89)
 1990s: 2 each for Aghabullogue (1991–98), Blarney (1992–93), Grenagh (1995–99) and Ballinora (1996–97)
 2000s: 6 for Grenagh (2000-01-03-04-05-07)
 2010s: 7 for Cloughduv (2010-11-14-15-17-18-19)

Gaps

Top ten longest gaps between successive championship titles:

 53 years: Ballinora (1929-1982)
 45 years: Inniscarra (1975-2020)
 31 years: Ballincollig (1932-1963)
 30 years: Éire Óg (1930-1960)
 29 years: Grenagh (1966-1995)
 24 years: Ballincollig (1963-1987)
 24 years: Cloughduv (1970-1994)
 23 years: Blarney (1946-1969)
 19 years: Ballinora (1997-2016)
 18 years: Aghabullogue (1955-1973)

2022 Championship

Group stage 
Group 1

Group 2

Group 3

Knockout stage

See also
Mid Cork Junior A Football Championship

External links
 Muskerry GAA website

References

Mid Cork Junior A Hurling Championship